Harold Stevens may refer to:

 Harold A. Stevens (1907–1990), American lawyer and judge
 Harold Stevens (broadcaster) (1883–1961), British colonel and BBC broadcaster
 Harold Stevens (Indian Civil Service officer) (1892–1969)